Sherlock Holmes is the overall title given to the series of radio dramas adapted from Arthur Conan Doyle's Sherlock Holmes stories that aired between 1952 and 1969 on BBC radio stations. The episodes starred Carleton Hobbs as Sherlock Holmes and Norman Shelley as Dr. Watson. All but four of Doyle's sixty Sherlock Holmes stories were adapted with Hobbs and Shelley in the leading roles, and some of the stories were adapted more than once with different supporting actors.

Most of the episodes were first broadcast on the BBC Home Service or the BBC Light Programme. The episodes were often broadcast as part of programmes such as Children's Hour or Thirty-Minute Theatre and did not originally air with an overall series title. The title Sherlock Holmes was used for some of the individual series and has been used for the overall series.

Production 

Starring Carleton Hobbs as Sherlock Holmes and Norman Shelley as Dr. Watson, the episodes were originally broadcast on BBC radio stations. Only four Sherlock Holmes stories by Arthur Conan Doyle were not adapted with Hobbs and Shelley: "The Yellow Face", "The Gloria Scott", "The Creeping Man", and "The Veiled Lodger". The 1960 adaptation of The Valley of Fear starring Hobbs and Shelley was the first radio dramatisation of that story, which was the only Holmes story by Doyle that was not adapted as part of the earlier American radio series The Adventures of Sherlock Holmes. The 1989–1998 BBC radio series would become the first radio series to adapt all the stories.

Several stories were adapted more than once with Hobbs and Shelley playing Holmes and Watson respectively, each time with a different supporting cast. Eight stories were adapted twice and five were adapted three times. For example, Professor Moriarty was played by a different actor in each of the three dramatisations of the story "The Final Problem" in the series: Ralph Truman (1955), Felix Felton (1957) and Rolf Lefebvre (1967).

Most of the episodes were adapted by Michael Hardwick. The early episodes, through the 1958 adaptation of The Hound of the Baskervilles, were adapted by Felix Felton. The following episodes through the adaptation of The Valley of Fear were adapted by Michael Hardwick. Alan Wilson adapted "Black Peter" (1961). Felix Felton is credited as the adapter for the second dramatisation of The Hound of the Baskervilles. The rest of the episodes were adapted by Hardwick.

Some episodes were released on CD by the BBC. Many of the episodes that originally aired in 1959 or later have been rebroadcast on BBC Radio 4 Extra.

Background 

Before playing Sherlock Holmes in the series, Carleton Hobbs had played Watson, with Arthur Wontner (who played Holmes in the 1931–1937 film series) as Holmes, in a radio adaptation of "The Boscombe Valley Mystery" in 1943. Norman Shelley, who played Watson in the series, had previously played Watson with Laidman Browne as Holmes in a radio adaptation of "Silver Blaze" in 1945. Both of these adaptations aired on the BBC Home Service. In addition to playing Watson and Holmes, Carleton Hobbs would later play Sherlock Holmes creator Arthur Conan Doyle in a BBC radio drama that aired in 1972.

During the same period that some of the dramatisations with Hobbs and Shelley were broadcast on the BBC Home Service, John Gielgud and Ralph Richardson played Holmes and Watson respectively in a separate series of dramatisations of twelve Sherlock Holmes stories for the BBC Light Programme. The series was titled The Adventures of Sherlock Holmes and aired in 1954.

Episode list 

Most of the episodes were thirty minutes long. Aside from the six-part adaptation of The Hound of the Baskervilles, the episodes adapted from novels were ninety minutes long.

Hobbs and Shelley also played Holmes and Watson respectively in a radio dramatisation of the play Sherlock Holmes, adapted for radio by Raymond Raikes. The production aired on the BBC Home Service on 3 January 1953.

Series 1
The following episodes aired on Children's Hour in 1952–1953 on the BBC Home Service.

Series 2
The following episodes aired on Children's Hour in 1954–1955 on the BBC Home Service.

Series 3
The following episodes aired on Children's Hour in 1957 on the BBC Home Service.

Series 4
The following episodes aired in 1958 on the BBC Light Programme, and are all parts of a six-part adaptation of The Hound of the Baskervilles.

Series 5
The following episodes aired on Thirty-Minute Theatre in 1959 on the BBC Light Programme.

Series 6
The following episodes aired in Thirty-Minute Theatre in 1960 on the BBC Light Programme.

Series 7
The following episodes aired in 1960–1961. "The Valley of Fear" and "The Hound of the Baskervilles" are each ninety minutes long and first aired on the BBC Home Service. "Black Peter" is thirty minutes long and first aired on the BBC Light Programme.

Series 8
The following episodes aired in 1961–1962 on the BBC Light Programme, without a series title.

Series 9
The following episodes aired under the title Sherlock Holmes in 1962 on the BBC Light Programme.

Series 10
The following ninety-minute episodes aired on the BBC Home Service on Saturday-Night Theatre.

Series 11
The following episodes aired under the title Sherlock Holmes Returns in 1964 on the BBC Light Programme. The first two episodes in the series were repeated recordings of the episodes that aired on 21 August 1962 and 4 September 1962 respectively.

Series 12
The following episodes aired under the title Sherlock Holmes Again in 1966–1967 on the BBC Light Programme.

Series 13
The following episodes aired under the title Sherlock Holmes in 1969 on BBC Radio 2.

References

External links 
 "The Man with the Twisted Lip" – A 1959 episode

BBC Home Service programmes
Detective radio shows
Works based on Sherlock Holmes
BBC Light Programme programmes